90º minuto (translated: "ninetieth minute") is an Italian long-running Sunday RAI television program broadcast since 1970. During its history, the title was also spelled as  Novantesimo minuto.

The sport program was created by  Maurizio Barendson, Paolo Valenti and Remo Pascucci. The program, which provides results and reports of Serie A and Serie B football matches, achieved its major fame between 1970s and early 1990s, mainly thanks to the popularity of its colorful group of stadium correspondents. The co-creator Paolo Valenti was the longest-running presenter of the program, from 1970 until a few months before his death in 1990. Later, several journalists alternated, notably Fabrizio Maffei, Giampiero Galeazzi and Paola Ferrari.

References

External links

1970 Italian television series debuts
Italian television shows
RAI original programming
1970s Italian television series
1980s Italian television series
1990s Italian television series
2000s Italian television series
2010s Italian television series
Association football television series